The women's triple jump at the 2022 World Athletics U20 Championships was held at the Estadio Olímpico Pascual Guerrero on 5 and 6 August.

33 athletes from 22 countries were entered to the competition, however 29 athletes from 20 countries were on the final entry list.

Records
U20 standing records prior to the 2022 World Athletics U20 Championships were as follows:

Results

Qualification
The qualification round took place on 5 August, in two groups, Group A started at 09:07 and Group B at 10:47. Athletes attaining a mark of at least 13.15 metres ( Q ) or at least the 12 best performers ( q ) qualified for the final.

Final
The final was started at 15:52 on 6 August.

References

Triple jump
Triple jump at the World Athletics U20 Championships